Juan Cruz Gill (born 18 July 1983) is an Argentine professional footballer who plays for Maltese Challenge League side Marsaxlokk, where he plays as a defender.

Playing career
He began as a professional footballer for Talleres de Córdoba of the Argentine Primera División during the 2004 season. His first match was on 20 June 2004, a 3–2 win over River Plate. After four seasons in the team of Córdoba, Cruz Gill moved to Chilean Primera División club Deportes Melipilla, where he had a successful spell personally, although his club was relegated to the second tier. In January 2009, he joined to Cypriot club Ermis Aradippou, champions of the Cypriot Second Division in the 2008-09 season.

In 2011, he moved to Venezuelan club Estudiantes de Mérida. The following year, Cruz Gill returned to Chile and joined to Primera B side Unión Temuco.

Gill signed for Maltese Challenge League side Marsaxlokk on 23 June 2021.

Personal life
Gill also obtained the Italian citizenship, due to his ancestry.

Honours

Club
Ermis Aradippou
 Cypriot Second Division (1): 2008-09

Valletta
 Maltese Premier League (3): 2015–16, 2017–18, 2018–19
 Maltese FA Trophy (1): 2017–18

References

External links
 
 Cruz Gill at Football Lineups
 Official Web Site

1983 births
Living people
People from Villa María
Sportspeople from Córdoba Province, Argentina
Argentine footballers
Argentine expatriate footballers
Association football defenders
Talleres de Córdoba footballers
Ermis Aradippou FC players
Unión Temuco footballers
Deportes Melipilla footballers
Deportes Temuco footballers
Valletta F.C. players
Tarxien Rainbows F.C. players
Sliema Wanderers F.C. players
Lija Athletic F.C. players
Marsaxlokk F.C. players
Primera B de Chile players
Chilean Primera División players
Argentine Primera División players
Cypriot First Division players
Cypriot Second Division players
Maltese Premier League players
Expatriate footballers in Chile
Expatriate footballers in Cyprus
Expatriate footballers in Venezuela
Expatriate footballers in Malta